Gadolinium phosphide is an inorganic compound of gadolinium and phosphorus with the chemical formula GdP.

Synthesis
Gadolinium phosphide can be obtained by reacting gadolinium and phosphorus at high temperature, and single crystals can be obtained by mineralization.
4 Gd + P4 → 4 GdP

Physical properties
GdP has a NaCl-structure and transforms to a CsCl-structure at 40 GPa.

GdP forms crystals of a cubic system, space group Fm3m.

Antiferromagnetic.

Uses
The compound is a semiconductor used in high power, high frequency applications and in laser diodes.

References

Phosphides
Gadolinium compounds
Semiconductors
Rock salt crystal structure